Flavors of Love is the third Japanese-language studio album of the South Korean boy group Monsta X. It was released and distributed by Universal Music Japan on May 5, 2021. The lead single of the same title was released on April 14.

Background and release 
The album was announced on March 9, as a surprise announcement following the release of the single album Wanted. It also include five new Japanese tracks as well as six previously released tracks. These previously released tracks were from Monsta X's three single albums released in 2020 and early 2021: Wish on the Same Sky, Love Killa (Japanese version), and Wanted. 

"Wanted" and "Neo Universe" were released as part of the single album Wanted, released on March 10. "Wanted" was pre-released on February 10 and its music video released on February 13.

The group pre-released the lead single "Flavors of Love" on April 14.

Commercial performance  
The album sold 20,312 copies for its first week, topping both the weekly charts for Billboard Japan and Tower Records Japan.

Three of the tracks, released as singles, charted on both the weekly Oricon Singles Chart and Billboard Japan Hot 100 chart.

Track listing

Charts

Album

Weekly charts

Songs

Weekly charts

Certification and sales

References 

2021 albums
Japanese-language albums
Universal Music Japan albums
Monsta X albums